Silverado High School (SHS) is a public secondary school in Las Vegas, Nevada, U.S. that is a part of the Clark County School District. Its mascot is the Skyhawk, and the school's colors are purple, teal, and white.

Notable alumni

 Amanda Bingson (2008) - 2012 Olympian in hammer throw
 Ben Jacobs - NFL linebacker for the Carolina Panthers
 Scott Fischman - professional poker player, Class of '98
 Mike Meyers (born 1993) - Major League Baseball outfielder
 Chasen Bradford - MLB pitcher for the New York Mets
 Drew Robinson - Outfielder/Infielder for the San Francisco Giants

Extracurricular activities

Athletics
Men's Baseball
Mike Meyers played shortstop for the school baseball team. In 2010, he was voted First Team All Southeast League. In 2011, he was voted First Team Class 4-A All-Southern Nevada.  In 2012, he was voted to the 2012 Louisville Slugger Pre-Season High School First Team All-America team, and was voted 2012 First Team Nevada All-State. He holds the high school's career (192) and single-season (59) records for runs scored, and its career records in doubles (50), triples (18), and steals (31).
State Champions
2000
 M Tennis
 (2005) AAAA Men's Doubles Champion.  Trenton Alenik and Chris Painter (32-0)
 W Tennis
 (2009) Women's Doubles State Champion.  Kristen Santero and Nicole Santero
 (2006, 2007, 2008) Women's Doubles State Runner-Up. Kristen Santero and Nicole Santero
 (2006, 2007, 2008, 2009) Women's Doubles Regional Champion. Kristen Santero and Nicole Santero
 Football
 (2007–08) Southeast Division Champions Record (10-1)
 (2021) State Champion
 (2022) State Champion
 Cheer
 (2007) State Runner-up
 (2008) State Runner-up
 (2009) State Champion
 (2010) State Champion
 (2010) National Finalist
 (2011) National Runner-Up
 Boys' Basketball
 Southeast Division Champion (2006)
 Girls' Basketball
 Region Champs 2007,2008
 Track
 Men's State Champions 2005,2011,2016
Men's Sunrise Champions
 2011,2007,2006,2005,2004,2002,2001,1999,2016
Women's Sunrise Region Champions
 2011,2006,2005,2003,2002,2001,2000,1999
 Men's Soccer
 (1999-2000)&(2004-2005)State Champions
Captain Michael Eshragh(2000)
Captains Kasey Chapman, James Eshragh, Ben Holt(2005)
 Women's Volleyball
Sunrise region Champions
 2006, 2007, 2008
State Champions 2007
State Champions 2009
State Champions 2010
 Men's Swimming
Regional Champions
2000, 2001
State Champions
2001
State Runners Up
2000, 2002
 Bowling
State Champions
2000 (School's first State Championship)
"Men's Volleyball"
Regional Champions
2003, 2006
State Runner Up
2006, 2012
 Dance

Band
Members who played professionally.
Richard Ginocchi - Trombone 
 2000-2009 at various Las Vegas Strip locations and local jazz shows.
Wind Symphony
Golden Division
Worldstrides Heritage Performance 2012 (San Diego)
1st Place
Superior Ratings at every CCSD Advanced Band Festival
Symphonic Band
Silver Division
Worldstrides Heritage Performance 2012 (San Diego)
1st Place
Marching Band

Additional Competitions
2007 Rubidoux Tournament (SCSBOA)
1st Place (4A Class)
2008 Boulder City Invitational (IND)
2nd Place (Open Class)
2009 West Covina Field Tournament (SCSBOA)
1st Place (4A Class)
2010 West Covina Holiday Classic (SCSBOA)
1st Place (4A Class)
2013 Tournament on the Turf (MBOS)
2nd Place (Sapphire Class)
2016 Valencia Field Tournament (SCSBOA)
4th Place (4A Class)
2017 Valencia Field Tournament (SCSBOA)
2nd Place (4A Class)
2022 St. George Regional (BOA)
18th Place (3A Class)

Feeder schools
 
Aggie Roberts Elementary School (1999)
Louis Wiener Junior Elementary School (1993)
Charlotte Hill Elementary School (1990)
Doris French Elementary School (1978)
John R. Beatty Elementary School (2000)
Roberta C. Cartwright Elementary School (1999)
Roger D. Gehring Elementary School (2002)
David M. Cox Elementary School (1990)
Jack Lund Schofield Middle School (2000)
Charles Silvestri Junior High School (1997)
Barbera & Hank Greenspun Junior High School (1991)

References

External links
 

Clark County School District
Educational institutions established in 1994
High schools in Clark County, Nevada
School buildings completed in 1994
Buildings and structures in Paradise, Nevada
Public high schools in Nevada
1994 establishments in Nevada